Greatest Hits is the first greatest hits album from country music duo Big & Rich. The album was released on September 29, 2009. The standard album features fifteen songs, including all of the duo's charting singles from their first three studio albums: 2004's Horse of a Different Color, 2005's Comin' to Your City and 2007's Between Raising Hell and Amazing Grace.  A previously unreleased track, titled "The Man I Am Right Now," was also included.  The DVD, which was released separately, features all of the duo's music videos, with the exception of the video for "Never Mind Me."

BigAndRich.com, the duo's official site, sold an exclusive limited edition version of the album which included the CD and DVD in a single package as well as bonus tracks on the CD.

Track listings

2014 release

DVD

Chart performance

References

2009 greatest hits albums
Big & Rich albums
Albums produced by John Rich
Albums produced by Paul Worley
Warner Records compilation albums